Heulette Clovance Fontenot Jr., known as Clo Fontenot (July 14, 1961 – September 29, 2019), was a Louisiana businessman and politician who served as a Republican in both houses of the Louisiana State Legislature.
While in office, Fontenot authored legislation protecting pets during emergency evacuations.

Fontenot received a B.S. from Louisiana State University, and served in municipal government for a time before winning election to state government. Fontenot was a presidential elector for George W. Bush and Dick Cheney in the 2000 United States presidential election. Fontenot declined to run for reelection in 2007 due to other employment commitments.

References

1961 births
Living people
Baptists from Louisiana
Louisiana local politicians
Republican Party Louisiana state senators
Louisiana State University alumni
Republican Party members of the Louisiana House of Representatives
People from Livingston Parish, Louisiana
Place of birth missing (living people)
Politicians from Baton Rouge, Louisiana